Streptomyces aldersoniae is a bacterium species from the genus  of Streptomyces.

See also
 List of Streptomyces species

References

Further reading

External links
Type strain of Streptomyces aldersoniae at BacDive -  the Bacterial Diversity Metadatabase

aldersoniae
Bacteria described in 2010